Eminence is a home rule class city in Henry County, Kentucky, in the United States. The population was 2,498 at the 2010 census, up from 2,231 at the 2000 census. Eminence is the largest city in Henry County. Eminence is home to the loudspeaker manufacturing company, Eminence Speaker.

Geography
Eminence is located in southern Henry County at  (38.368127, -85.180449). It is bordered to the south by Shelby County.

Kentucky Route 55 is Main Street through Eminence. KY 55 leads north  to New Castle, the Henry County seat, and south  to Shelbyville.

The source of the Little Kentucky River, a tributary of the Kentucky River, is just west of Eminence, while Town Creek to the north and Drennon Creek to the east also rise in Eminence and flow north to the Kentucky River. Fox Run rises in the southern part of Eminence and flows south via Bullskin Creek and Brashears Creek to the Salt River. The Kentucky and the Salt River are both tributaries of the Ohio River.

History
The area post office, established in 1836, was moved to Eminence in 1850, and named for its supposed location at the highest point on the railroad line between Louisville and Lexington. The city was formally incorporated in 1851.

The Eminence Historic Commercial District was listed on the National Register of Historic Places in 1979.

Demographics

As of the census of 2000, there were 2,231 people, 944 households, and 623 families residing in the city. The racial makeup of the city was 83.59% White, 11.65% Black or African American, 0.31% Native American, 0.36% Asian, 2.11% from other races, and 1.97% from two or more races. Hispanic or Latino of any race were 3.81% of the population.

There were 944 households, out of which 30.8% had children under the age of 18 living with them, 42.4% were married couples living together, 18.0% had a female householder with no husband present, and 34.0% were non-families. 30.6% of all households were made up of individuals, and 12.9% had someone living alone who was 65 years of age or older. The average household size was 2.36 and the average family size was 2.91.

In the city, the population was spread out, with 25.3% under the age of 18, 9.6% from 18 to 24, 28.2% from 25 to 44, 22.1% from 45 to 64, and 14.8% who were 65 years of age or older. The median age was 36 years. For every 100 females, there were 89.1 males. For every 100 females age 18 and over, there were 82.4 males.

The median income for a household in the city was $30,323, and the median income for a family was $36,053. Males had a median income of $30,893 versus $21,042 for females. The per capita income for the city was $15,337. About 14.9% of families and 17.1% of the population were below the poverty line, including 21.0% of those under age 18 and 21.5% of those age 65 or over.

Education
Education in Eminence is administered by the Eminence Independent School District.

Eminence has a lending library, the Henry County Public Library.

Arts and culture
The city is home to the Highland Renaissance Festival, which runs from May through July. Eminence also hosts a Celtic Fest in September.

Notable people from Eminence 
Anne Braden (1924-2006), civil rights activist 

David Emmanuel Goatley, President, Fuller Seminary , and former Research Professor of Theology and Black Church Studies, Duke Divinity School 

James Green, track star, first Black student-athlete to graduate from University of Kentucky

Sharon Ruble, bass player, member of Reel World String Band

Lamont Sleets, basketball player, Murray State Racers Hall of Fame 

Hollis Summers, (1916-1987), poet, novelist, short story writer and editor

References

External links
 City of Eminence official website
 Eminence Independent School District

Cities in Kentucky
Cities in Henry County, Kentucky
Louisville metropolitan area
Populated places established in 1851
1851 establishments in Kentucky